The 2018 LSU Tigers football team represented Louisiana State University during the 2018 NCAA Division I FBS football season. The Tigers played their home games at Tiger Stadium in Baton Rouge, Louisiana and competed in the West Division of the Southeastern Conference (SEC). They were led by second-year head coach Ed Orgeron.

The Tigers, coming off a 9–4 season in Orgeron's first full season, began the year ranked 25th in the preseason AP Poll. In the first game of the year, the team defeated No. 8 Miami (FL) in the Advocare Classic played at AT&T Stadium in Arlington, Texas. LSU won its next four games, including on the road against then-No. 7 Auburn, and rose to fifth in the AP Poll, before falling on the road to Florida. The team rebounded with wins over No. 2 Georgia and No. 22 Mississippi State before being shutout by eventual SEC champions Alabama. In the last game of the regular season, LSU lost on the road against Texas A&M in an FBS record-tying seven overtimes. The final score of the game, 74–72, set the FBS record for combined points in a single game (146). The team finished the regular season tied for second in the SEC's West Division and was invited to the Fiesta Bowl to play UCF, which the Tigers won by a score of 40–32 to end UCF's active win streak of 25 games. LSU finished the season with an overall record of 10–3 and was ranked 6th in the final AP Poll.

The team's defense featured three consensus All-Americans in defensive backs Grant Delpit and Greedy Williams, and linebacker Devin White, who was awarded the Dick Butkus Award as the nation's best linebacker. On offense, the Tigers were led by redshirt junior quarterback Joe Burrow, who finished with 2,894 passing yards and 23 total touchdowns (16 passing and 7 rushing). Senior running back Nick Brossette led the team in rushing with 1,039 yards and 14 touchdowns.

Previous season
The Tigers finished the 2017 season 9–4, 6–2 in SEC play to finish in third place in the Western Division. They were invited to the Citrus Bowl where they lost to Notre Dame.

Recruiting

Position key

Recruits

The Tigers signed a total of 22 recruits.

Preseason

Award watch lists
Listed in the order that they were released

SEC media poll
The SEC media poll was released on July 20, 2018 with the Tigers selected to finish in fifth place in the West Division.

Preseason All-SEC teams
The Tigers had five players selected to the preseason all-SEC teams.

Offense

2nd team

Garrett Brumfield – OL

Defense

1st team

Devin White – LB

Greedy Williams – DB

3rd team

Rashard Lawrence – DL

Specialists

Zach Von Rosenberg – P

Schedule

Roster

Game summaries

vs Miami (FL)

Southeastern Louisiana

at Auburn

Louisiana Tech

Ole Miss

at Florida

Georgia

Mississippi State

Alabama

at Arkansas

Rice

at Texas A&M

Highest scoring game in FBS History

vs. UCF (Fiesta Bowl)

Rankings

Players drafted into the NFL

References

LSU
LSU Tigers football seasons
LSU Tigers football
Fiesta Bowl champion seasons